Omar Royero Gutiérrez (born 23 July 1975) is a Colombian former professional footballer who played as a defender. He is currently an assistant coach at Pérez Zeledón, where he played for two seasons in the early 2000s. During his career, he also appeared with Atlético Junior, Deportivo Cali, Deportivo Pasto, Cobán Imperial, Liberia Mía, Santos de Guápiles, Carmelita, and UCR. Royero participated in the 1998 Copa Merconorte with runners-up Deportivo Cali.

References

External links
 
 

1975 births
Living people
Colombian footballers
Atlético Junior footballers
Deportivo Cali footballers
Deportivo Pasto footballers
Municipal Pérez Zeledón footballers
Cobán Imperial players
Municipal Liberia footballers
Santos de Guápiles footballers
A.D. Carmelita footballers
C.F. Universidad de Costa Rica footballers
Colombian expatriate footballers
Expatriate footballers in Costa Rica
Association football defenders